Acadie is a community in the Canadian province of New Brunswick.

History

Notable people

See also
List of communities in New Brunswick

References

Communities in Kent County, New Brunswick